Birthday is the debut studio album of the Japanese pop music duo ClariS, released on April 11, 2012 by SME Records. The album contains 12 music tracks, four of which were previously released on four of ClariS' singles. Three different editions of the album were released: a regular CD version, a two-CD limited edition and a CD+DVD limited edition. Birthday peaked at No. 2 on the Japanese Oricon weekly albums chart and was awarded a Gold Disc by the Recording Industry Association of Japan in May 2012.

Five of the songs were used as theme songs for various media: "Irony" was used as the opening theme to the 2010 anime television series Oreimo; "Koi Jishaku" was the first ending theme to the 2012 variety show Koekita!!; "Nexus" was the opening theme of the Ore no Imōto ga Konna ni Kawaii Wake ga Nai Portable ga Tsuzuku Wake ga Nai video game, as well as the theme for the ninth volume of the Oreimo light novels; "Connect" was used as the opening theme to the 2011 anime television series Puella Magi Madoka Magica; and "Naisho no Hanashi" was the ending theme to the 2012 anime television series Nisemonogatari.

Release and reception
Birthday was released on April 11, 2012 in three editions: a regular CD version, a two-CD limited edition and a CD+DVD limited edition. The second CD bundled with the first limited edition version contained a short version of their song "Anata ni Fit" from their third single "Nexus" and the theme song to the Nendoroid brand of plastic figures, "Nen-Do-Roido"; this version also included two Nendoroid figures of ClariS. The DVD bundled with the second limited edition version contained non-credit opening and ending videos for "Irony", "Connect" and "Naisho no Hanashi" and a collection of television commercials featuring those songs. For the week of April 9, 2012 on Oricon's weekly albums chart, Birthday was reported to have sold 53,909 copies in its first week of sales, peaking at No. 2, and charted for 28 weeks. In May 2012, Birthday was awarded a Gold Disc by the Recording Industry Association of Japan for having exceeded 100,000 copies shipped in a single year.

Track listing

Personnel

ClariS
Clara – vocals
Alice – vocals

Additional musicians
Takuya – chorus
Hiroomi Shitara – guitar
Takuya – guitar
Manabu Nimura – bass
Atsushi Yuasa – bass
Takashi Kashikura – drums, tambourine
Atsuhiro Murakami – drum tech
Ryo – organ

Production
Daisuke Katsurada – executive producer
Chiemi Kominami – executive producer
Shunsuke Muramatsu – executive producer
Ken'ichi Nakata – executive producer
Tadayuki Kominami – producer
Dai Ishikawa – director
Takashi Koiwa – mixer
Shunroku Hitani – mixer
Kazuhiro Yamada – mixer
Yuji Chinone – mastering
Shinobu Matsuoka – management
Kaori Kimura – products coordination
Motohiro Yamazaki – art direction, design

References

2012 debut albums
ClariS albums
Japanese-language albums
Sony Music albums